Australartona mirabilis is a moth of the family Zygaenidae. It is found in Australia in southern temperate mountain rainforests in New South Wales and southern Queensland. The length of the forewings is 8–8.5 mm. It is a weak flyer. Adults are on the wing during the day. The larvae probably feed on Tetrarrhena juncea. Adults feed on flower nectar of Helichrysum species.

References

External links
Australian Faunal Directory

Procridinae
Moths described in 2005